Nebneteru Tenry was an ancient Egyptian High Priest of Amun under Seti I.

Family
Nebneteru's wife Merytre was "Chief of the Harem of Amun". Nebneteru and Merytre are known from monuments of their son, the vizier Paser. They are mentioned in TT106, the tomb of Paser, "Governor of the Town" and Vizier as well as on statues belonging to him.

Another son of Nebneteru Tjenry and Merytre is mentioned in the tomb of Paser. A man by the name of Titi(a), "Steward in the temple of Maat" is shown. Nebneteru's in-laws are mentioned as well. Merytre was the daughter of Aniy and born of the lady Nuia.

On a statue of Paser from Memphis, Merytre is said to come from Memphis (Hutkaptah). Nebneteru is mentioned on the statue as well and his titles are given as: "High Priest of Amun in Southern Heliopolis" (i.e. Thebes) and "Sem–Priest in the Temple of Ptah".

The stamped text on a mudbrick now at the National Archaeological Museum of Florence (inv. no.  2641) reads:

References

Ancient Egyptian priests
Nineteenth Dynasty of Egypt
Theban High Priests of Amun
Year of birth unknown
Year of death unknown